Claudio Baiocchi (August 20, 1940 – December 14, 2020) was an Italian mathematician. He was a professor at the University of Pavia and since the 1990s he was a professor of mathematical higher analysis at the Sapienza University.

He worked on partial differential equations and the calculus of variations. In 1971 he applied his mathematical methods to a free boundary problem in the filtration of liquids through porous media with applications in civil engineering (by using the Baiocchi transform).

His later research dealt with, among other topics, the Collatz problem, cellular automata and Turing machines.

In 1970 Baiocchi received the Caccioppoli Prize. In 1974 he was an invited speaker at the International Congress of Mathematicians in Vancouver. He was elected to the Accademia dei XL and the Accademia dei Lincei.

Selected publications
with V. Comincioli, E. Magenes & G. A. Pozzi: 

with Antonio Capelo: Variational and quasivariational inequalities. Applications to free boundary problems. Chichester/New York, Wiley 1984.
with G. Buttazzo, F. Gastaldi & F. Tomarelli: 
with F. Brezzi & L. D. Marini; 
as editor with Jacques-Louis Lions: Boundary value problems for partial differential equations and applications. Dedicated to Enrico Magenes, Elsevier-Masson, 1993
with F. Brezzi & L. P. Franca:

References

External links

1940 births
2020 deaths
Italian mathematicians
Academic staff of the University of Pavia
Academic staff of the Sapienza University of Rome
Cellular automatists